Kadamalaikundu is a village in Theni district, Tamil Nadu state, India.

Villages in Theni district